Sara Johanna Angelini Giacche (born December 1987 in Valencia, Venezuela) is a model and pageant titleholder. She was represented the Yaracuy state in the Miss Venezuela 2006 pageant, on September 14, 2006.

Angelini competed in the Sambil Model / Miss Earth Venezuela 2009 pageant on June 12, 2009, in Margarita Island, Venezuela, and made it to the top-5 finalists.

References

External links
 Miss Venezuela Official Website
 Miss Earth / Sambil Model Venezuela Official Website
 Miss Earth Official Page
 Miss Venezuela La Nueva Era MB

1987 births
Living people
People from Valencia, Venezuela
Venezuelan female models